Mahbubur Rahman (born February 1, 1969, Mymensingh District, Dhaka) is a former Bangladeshi cricketer who played in one ODI in 1999.
In the 1980s Mymensingh was a great hub for producing cricketing talent in Bangladesh. Mahbubur Rahman, also known as Selim, was one of the finest talents to come from there. A right-handed middle order batsman, he occasionally bowled spin as well. In the 1989 U-19 Asia cup he scored 40 against Sri Lanka and 28 against Pakistan.  Unfortunately he took too long to make the transformation to the senior team. Thus he played in only one ODI, against Zimbabwe, at Dhaka in 1999.

References

External links
 

1969 births
Living people
Bangladesh One Day International cricketers
Bangladeshi cricketers
Dhaka Division cricketers
People from Mymensingh